The Taking the Initiative Party (TTIP) is a British political party emerging from the Black Lives Matter movement. It was formed in 2016 by Charles Gordon, and registered with the Electoral Commission in October 2017.

History 
TTIP had been formed in 2016, although it registered with the Electoral Commission one year later, with an objective of nominating thirty two candidates for the Croydon London Borough Council's 2022 election. The training courses and meetups organized by the party for people with nonpolitical backgrounds has led to the TTIP being perceived as an "inclusive" and antielitist party by some. Charles Gordon, a founding member of the party, said "Our overall objective is to create a parliament that reflects the multicultural society we’ve become over the years."

Sasha Johnson, a leading member of the party, said that it would be "the first black-led political party in the UK". It was set up with the intention of focusing on education, housing, knife crime, discrimination, taxation and the benefits system. The party's mission statement says, "We want to be a new voice on the political stage to channel local knowledge and expertise, to come up with creative solutions and to make sure that resources go where they are needed most."

In 2021, TTIP introduced a petition calling the government to launch a database in which the identity details of persons with a history of racial or homophobic offenses would be stored. The intention was to allow companies, and organizations to use such a database as part of the background check when recruiting new employees. The petition, which received 10,979 signatures, was rejected by the government on 26 January 2021.

The Taking the Initiative Party made their electoral debut in the 2021 United Kingdom local elections, standing a small number of candidates in Enfield and Croydon, without success.

In February 2021 Trevor Phillips, former chair of the Equality and Human Rights Commission, called the party a "bunch of idiots" and criticised the group's leader, Charles Gordon, for his anti-vaccination comments.

In May 2021, Sasha Johnson was shot in the head and was taken to the hospital in critical condition. Five males were arrested on suspicion of her attempted murder.

Croydon elections

Council elections 
In the 2022 United Kingdom local elections, Taking the Initiative Party put forward 20 candidates for the 28 wards in Croydon. They won no seats.

Mayoral elections
Farah London, who was an independent candidate in the 2021 London mayoral election, was their Croydon mayoral candidate for the election on 5 May 2022. She came sixth, with 6 per cent of the vote.

References

Black Lives Matter
21st-century social movements
2020 establishments in the United Kingdom
Racism in the United Kingdom
Anti-racism
Civil rights protests
Criminal justice reform
Criticism of police brutality
Organizations established in 2020
Race and crime
Social justice organizations
Black Power